Kevin McNeany (born 1943 Keady, Northern Ireland), is an entrepreneur and innovator specifically in the education and international education sectors. He started off as a teacher in 1964 and has since founded Nord Anglia Education (1972) and Orbital Education (2008). He led the IPO of Nord Anglia Education PLC in 1997 as the first and still the only education company to gain a full listing in the London Stock Exchange. Currently he is the Chairman of Orbital Education which focuses on running international schools and colleges which offer quality education, mainly in British style and tradition, to expatriate and host families in countries throughout the world.

Kevin received the Outstanding individual contribution accolade at the Education Investor awards on 13 November 2014. The award was given to highlight the innovation, dedication and contribution that Kevin has had to the education sector.

References

1943 births
Living people
Businesspeople from Northern Ireland
People from County Armagh